Hardy Fishing Rods is a brand of Pure Fishing.

In 1874 brothers William Hardy and John James Hardy started "Hardy Brothers" with the purchase of "Superior River and Sea Fishing Tackle" in Alnwick, Northumberland, England. 

In 1891 they patented and launched "the Perfect" fishing reel to complement the fishing lures they sold. It was successful and they  received a royal warrant from King George V of the United Kingdom. They went on to develop numerous  fishing reels featuring innovations like a full bail arm and long distance casting reels that would win competitions.

In 1897 they opened a shop in London's  Pall Mall that lead to international expansion of their fishing rods, lures and guides still made by hand in England.

In 1967 Hardy Brothers was bought out by the Harris and Sheldon group and in 1985 renamed the "House of Hardy Limited." It was later merged with a former Hardy employee's fishing company and renamed "Hardy and Greys Limited" in 2004.

In 2008 the history of the House of Hardy was made into a documentary, The Lost World of Mr. Hardy.

In 2013 the company Hardy & Greys was sold to Pure Fishing, a division of conglomerate Jarden Corporation, that was later renamed Newell Brands. Newell sold Pure Fishing to Sycamore Partners in 2018.

External links
 Hardy Fishing - official website
 Hardy Fishing Museum - House of Hardy Fishing Tackle Museum 
 The Lost World of Mr. Hardy (2008) - Documentary film on the Hardy Fishing company's history of hand made.

References

Fishing equipment manufacturers